Bahena is a Spanish-language surname. Notable people with the surname include:

 Alejandro Bahena Flores (born 1953), Mexican politician
 Ernesto Bahena (born 1961), Mexican wrestler
 Gerardo Bernal Bahena (born 1989), Mexican professional footballer
 Hirving Lozano Bahena (born 1995), Mexican professional footballer
 Cristhian Bahena Rivera, suspect in the killing of Mollie Tibbetts

Spanish-language surnames